Zodarion ludibundum is a spider species found in Corsica, Sicily and Algeria.

See also 
 List of Zodariidae species

References

External links 

ludibundum
Spiders of Europe
Spiders of North Africa
Spiders described in 1984